Ptisi Gia Dio is second studio album by Greek singer Mando. It was released in Greece in 1990 by Minos. The album was her first hit album to be released in the 1990s.

Track listing
 "Kane Ki Esi Mia Trela"
 "Stihimatizo"
 "Pos"
 "Klemmeni Zoi"
 "Stagona Ston Okeano"
 "Soma Me Soma Fili Me Fili"
 "Ena Kalokeri Erotas"
 "I Koukla"
 "Kratisou Kala"
 "Kenouria Zoi"
 "Agria Fraoula"

References

1990 albums
Greek-language albums
Mando (singer) albums
Minos EMI albums